Wainwright is an unincorporated community in northern Warwick Township, Tuscarawas County, Ohio, United States.  It lies along Wainwright Road, between Tuscarawas and New Philadelphia.

History
A post office called Wainwright has been in operation since 1895. Wainwright originally was a mining community and the Wainwright Coal Company operated there.

References

Unincorporated communities in Tuscarawas County, Ohio
Unincorporated communities in Ohio